Jon Bleby (born 11 September 1979) in Torquay is a former international field hockey player who played as a defender for England and Great Britain.

He is now an international field hockey coach for England & GB.

He represented Great Britain in Field hockey at the 2008 Summer Olympics. He had 54 caps representing England and 32 caps representing Great Britain as at 11 August 2008.

He now works for Independent Coach Education, the leading provider of coach education in the UK.

References
Profile at www.greatbritainhockey.co.uk

External links
 

1981 births
Living people
English male field hockey players
Olympic field hockey players of Great Britain
British male field hockey players
Male field hockey defenders
English field hockey coaches
Field hockey players at the 2006 Commonwealth Games
2006 Men's Hockey World Cup players
Field hockey players at the 2008 Summer Olympics
Loughborough Students field hockey players
Commonwealth Games competitors for England